The following is a timeline of the history of the city of Meknes, Morocco.

Prior to 20th century

 40 CE - Romans in power in Volubilis.
 217 CE - Caracallas Victory Arch erected (approximate date) in Volubilis.
 285 CE - Volubilis "abandoned by the Roman military;" Berber Baqates subsequently rise to power.
 10th century CE - Zenata Berber Miknasa settle in area (approximate date).

 1140/1141 - Siege of Meknes by forces of Abd al-Mu'min begins (approximate date).
 1150 - Siege of Meknes ends; Almohads sack town.
 1170s - Al-Najjarin mosque minaret built.
 1236/1237 - Marinids occupy Meknes.
 1245/1246 - Marinid governor killed.
 13th century: "Aqueduct, several bridges, a kasbah, mosques" and madrasas ('Attaririn, Filala, Jadida) built.
 1345 - Bou Inania Madrasa (Meknes) (school) built (approximate date).
 15th century: Maraboutic zawiya established.
 1526 - Death of religious leader Mohamed ben Issa.
 1640 -  in power.
 1672 - "Mulay Ismail makes Meknes the capital of the kingdom and starts work on his royal fortress complete with palaces, granaries, lakes and stables."
 1703 - Mulay Ismail Mausoleum construction begins.
 1709 - Bab Berdieyinne Mosque completed.
 1727 - Death of Mulay Ismail.
 1732/1733 - Madinat al-Riyad demolished.
 1755 - Earthquake.
 1832 - French artist Delacroix visits Meknes.
 1882 -  (palace) construction begins.
 1889 - Bab Dar al-Makhzen (gate) built.(fr)

20th century
 1902 - Population: 20,000 (estimate).
 1911 - French military under  take Meknes during the French conquest of Morocco.
 1913 - Dar El Bachaouate built.
 1914 - École française de Meknès (school) organized.
 1918 - Military school founded.
 1926 - Dar Jamai museum established.
 1937 - Anti-French unrest.
 1942 -  (school) founded.
 1947 -  founded.
 1951 - Population: 140,380.
 1960 - Population: 175,943.
 1962
 Stade d'Honneur (stadium) opens.
 COD Meknès (football club) formed.
 1967 - June: Ethnic unrest.
 1973 - Population: 244,520.
 1982 -  (college) established.
 1989 - Moulay Ismail University founded.
 1994 - Population: 443,214.
 1996 - City historic centre designated an UNESCO World Heritage Site.
 1997 -  (school) established.

21st century

 2003 - Aboubakr Belkora becomes mayor.
 2004 - Population: 536,322.
 2005 - Hassan Aourid becomes governor.
 2007 - Wine festival held.
 2009 -  becomes mayor.
 2010 - 19 February: Collapse of minaret of Bab Berdieyinne Mosque; dozens of fatalities.
 2014 - Population: 685,408 (estimate).
 2015
 Abdallah Bouanou becomes mayor.
 City becomes part of the Fès-Meknès administrative region.

See also
 Meknes history (fr)
 Timelines of other cities in Morocco: Casablanca, Fes, Marrakesh, Rabat, Tangier

References

This article incorporates information from the Arabic Wikipedia and French Wikipedia.

Bibliography

in English
 
 
 
 
 
 
 "Meknès." Grove Encyclopedia of Islamic Art and Architecture. Ed. Jonathan M. Bloom and Sheila S. Blair. Oxford University Press, 2010

in French

External links

  (Images, etc.)
  (Images, etc.)
  (Bibliography of open access  articles)

Meknes
Meknes
Meknes